Flat3 is a New Zealand comedy web series written and directed by Roseanne Liang. It stars co-creators JJ Fong as Jessica, Perlina Lau as Perlina, and Ally Xue as Lee.

Flat3 premiered on YouTube and Vimeo on 22 February 2013.  The show focuses around three Asian Kiwi girls living together in Auckland. Lee, Jessica, and Perlina are young flat-mates looking for romance, employment, and self-confidence in creative and comedic world. The style is self-described as "sometimes smart, often silly, a little rude and a lot awkward".

History
JJ Fong, Perlina Lau and Ally Xue were inspired to create a comedy web series after experiencing a lack of roles as Asian actresses working in the New Zealand screen industry. Flat3 formed when Roseanne Liang of My Wedding and Other Secrets joined the team as writer and director. After missing out on funding from New Zealand On Air, the creators called upon friends to help shoot the first season. The show was screened at the Friars Comedy Club Festival 2013 in New York.

Season three received NZ$100,000 funding from New Zealand on Air. It was also the shows final season, although there were suggestions of a possible television show.

Season 1
Season one features six 7-minute episodes.  The plot follows Lee, Jessica, and Perlina as they try to "figure out who they are, what they’re doing in this life, and whose turn it is to buy toilet paper."

CAST

MAIN CAST:
 Ally Xue as Lee [episode 1-6]
 J.J. Fong as Jessica [episode 1-6]
 Perlina Lau as Perlina [episode 1-6]

RECURRING CAST:
 Katrina Wesseling as Katrina [episode 1-6]
 Simon Ward as Simon [episode 1-6]
 Matariki Whatarau as Aiden [episode 1-6]
 Mike Ginn as Jackie Chan [episode 2 and 4]

GUEST CAST:
 Nic Sampson as Nic [episode 3]
 Dan Cowley as Dan/Career Consultant [episode 1]
 Hweiling Ow as Hweiling [episode 2]
 Keira Christina as Keira [episode 2]

Season 2
Season 2 continues to follow Lee, Jessica and Perlina. 

CAST

MAIN CAST:
 Ally Xue as Lee [episode 1-6]
 J.J. Fong as Jessica [episode 1-6]
 Perlina Lau as Perlina [episode 1-6]

RECURRING CAST:
 Katrina Wesseling as Katrina [episode 1,5]
 Calum Gittins as Calum [episode 1,5]

SPECIAL GUEST CAST:
 Rose Matafeo as Rose [episode 2]
 Kerry Warkia as Kerry/Maitre'd [episode 2]
 Paul Gittins as Paul [episode 5]
 Kiel McNaughton as Hitchhiker [episode 6]

GUEST CAST:
 Simon Ward as Simon [episode 2]
 Nic Sampson as Nic [episode 3]
 Hweiling Ow as Hweiling [episode 5]
 Keira Christina as Keira[episode 5]
 Susanna Tang as Xana [episode 6]
 Jordan Selwyn as Leon [episode 6]

Season 3
Season 3 continues to follow Lee, Jessica and Perlina in their FINAL SEASON, 2014.

CAST

MAIN CAST:
 Ally Xue as Lee [episode 1-6]
 J.J. Fong as Jessica [episode 1-6]
 Perlina Lau as Perlina [episode 1-6]

RECURRING CAST:
 Katrina Wesseling as Katrina [episode 1-3]
 Nic Sampson as Nic [episode 3,5-6]
 Dan Cowley as Dan [episode 1-3,5]
 Yoson An as Yoson [episode 1-3,5-6]
 Taofia Pelesasa as Fia [episode 2-3]

SPECIAL GUEST CAST:
 Madeleine Sami as Madeline [episode 2 and 6]
 Kerry Warkia as Kerry [episode 2]
 Shannon Ryan as Shannon Ryan [episode 2]
 Shavaughn Ruakere as Mascot Lady [episode 4]
 Olivia Tennet as Lee [episode 5]
 Kimberley Crossman as Jessica [episode 5]
 Chelsea McEwan Miller as Perlina [episode 5]
 Pua Magasiva as Winston [episode 6]
 Johnny Barker as Director [episode 5 and 6]

GUEST CAST:
 Simon Ward as Simon [episode 1]
 Susanna Tang as Xana [episode 4]
 Jordan Selwyn as Leon [episode 4]

References

External links
Flat3 official site

New Zealand rock music groups